Chaeteessa caudata is a species of praying mantis in the family Chaeteessidae.

References

Mantodea
Articles created by Qbugbot
Insects described in 1871